The Master-General of the Ordnance (MGO) was a very senior British military position from 1415 to 2013 (except 1855–1895 and 1939–1958) with some changes to the name, usually held by a serving general. The Master-General of the Ordnance was responsible for all British artillery, engineers, fortifications, military supplies, transport, field hospitals and much else, and was not subordinate to the commander-in chief of the British military. In March 2013 the holder was titled as "Director Land Capability and Transformation", but still sat on the Army Board as Master-General of the Ordnance; in September 2013 the post was eliminated.

History
The Office of Armoury split away from the Privy Wardrobe of the Tower (of London) in the early 15th century. The Master of the Ordnance came into being in 1415 with the appointment of Nicholas Merbury by Henry V. The Office of Ordnance was created by Henry VIII in 1544 and became the Board of Ordnance in 1597. Its head was the Master-General of the Ordnance; his subordinates included the Lieutenant-General of the Ordnance and the Surveyor-General of the Ordnance. Before the establishment of a standing army or navy, the Ordnance Office was the only permanent military department in England. In 1764 it established the British standard ordnance weights and measurements for the artillery, one of the earliest standards in the world.

The position of Master-General was frequently a cabinet-level one, especially in the late 18th and early 19th centuries, when it was normally a political appointment. In 1855 the post was discontinued and certain of the ceremonial aspects of the post were subsequently vested in the Commander-in-Chief of the Forces. In 1904, the post was re-established, and until 1938 the Master-General of the Ordnance was the Fourth Military Member of the Army Board.

In 1913, the control of military aviation was separated from the responsibilities of the Master-General of the Ordnance. A new Department of Military Aeronautics was established and Brigadier-General Henderson was appointed the first director.

In March 2013, the holder was titled as "Director Land Capability and Transformation" but still sat on the army board as Master-General of the Ordnance. In September 2013, the post was abolished.

Masters of the Ordnance 1415–1544

 Nicholas Merbury, 1415–1420 
 John Hampton 1429
 William Gloucestre, 1435
 Gilbert Par, 1437
 Thomas Vaughan 1450
 John Judde 1456–1460 (murdered 1460)
 Philip Herveys c.1461 
 Richard Guildford 1485–1494
 Robert Clifford 1495– (died 1508)
 Sir Sampson Norton 1511–1513
 Sir Henry Willoughby 1513
 Sir William Skeffington 1529–1535
 Bernardin de Valois (Bernadyne de Wallys) 1536
 Sir Christopher Morris 1537–1544

Masters-General of the Ordnance, 1544–1855
Source: Institute of Historical Research

 Sir Thomas Seymour 1544–1547
 Sir Philip Hoby 1547–1554
 Sir Richard Southwell 1554–1559
 Ambrose Dudley, 3rd Earl of Warwick 1560–1585
 Ambrose Dudley, 3rd Earl of Warwick jointly with Sir Philip Sidney 1585–1586
 Ambrose Dudley, 3rd Earl of Warwick 1586–1590
 Sir Henry Lee 1590–1597
 Robert Devereux, 2nd Earl of Essex 1597–1601
 vacant 1601–1603
 Charles Blount, 1st Earl of Devonshire 1603–1606
 vacant 1606–1608
 George Carew, 1st Lord Carew, 1st Earl of Totnes (1626) 1608–1629
 Horace Vere, 1st Lord Vere of Tilbury 1629–1634
 Mountjoy Blount, 1st Earl of Newport 1634–1661
 Sir William Compton 1661–1663
 in commission 1664–1670
William Berkeley, 1st Baron Berkeley
Sir John Duncombe
Thomas Chicheley
 Sir Thomas Chicheley 1670–1679
 in commission 1679–1682
Sir John Chicheley
Sir William Hickman, Bt.
Sir Christopher Musgrave, Bt
 George Legge, 1st Baron Dartmouth 1682–1688
 Frederick Schomberg, 1st Duke of Schomberg 1689–1690
 vacant 1690–1693
 Henry Sidney, 1st Earl of Romney 1693–1702
 John Churchill, 1st Duke of Marlborough 1702–1712
 Richard Savage, 4th Earl Rivers 1712
 James Hamilton, 4th Duke of Hamilton 1712
 vacant 1712–1714
 John Churchill, 1st Duke of Marlborough 1714–1722
 William Cadogan, 1st Earl Cadogan 1722–1725
 François de La Rochefoucauld, marquis de Montandre 1725
 John Campbell, 2nd Duke of Argyll 1725–1740
 John Montagu, 2nd Duke of Montagu 1740–1742
 John Campbell, 2nd Duke of Argyll 1742
 John Montagu, 2nd Duke of Montagu 1742–1749
 vacant 1749–1755
 Charles Spencer, 3rd Duke of Marlborough 1755–1758
 vacant 1758–1759
 John Ligonier, 1st Viscount Ligonier 1759–1763
 John Manners, Marquess of Granby 1763–1770
 vacant 1770–1772
 George Townshend, 4th Viscount Townshend 1772–1782
 Charles Lennox, 3rd Duke of Richmond 1782–1783
 George Townshend, 4th Viscount Townshend 1783–1784
 Charles Lennox, 3rd Duke of Richmond 1784–1795
 Charles Cornwallis, 1st Marquess Cornwallis 1795–1801
 John Pitt, 2nd Earl of Chatham 1801–1806
 Francis Rawdon Hastings, 2nd Earl of Moira 1806–1807
 John Pitt, 2nd Earl of Chatham 1807–1810
 Henry Phipps, 1st Earl of Mulgrave 1810–1819
 Arthur Wellesley, 1st Duke of Wellington 1819–1827
 Henry William Paget, 1st Marquess of Anglesey 1827–1828
 William Carr Beresford, 1st Viscount Beresford 1828–1830
 Sir James Kempt 1830–1834
 Sir George Murray 1834–1835
 Sir Richard Hussey Vivian, 1st Bt. 1835–1841
 Sir George Murray 1841–1846
 Henry William Paget, 1st Marquess of Anglesey 1846–1852
 Henry Hardinge, 1st Viscount Hardinge 1852
 Fitzroy James Henry Somerset, 1st Baron Raglan 1852–1855

1855–1894 
The post did not exist for the period 1855 to 1894.

Inspector-General of the Ordnance 1895 to 1899In 1895 the post was revived, but re-styled Inspector-General.Included: 
 Lieutenant-General Sir Edwin Markham, April 1895 – December 1898

Director-General of the Ordnance 1899 to 1904
Included: 
 General Sir Henry Brackenbury, February 1899 – February 1904

Master-General of the Ordnance 1904 to 1938
Holders of the post have included:
 Lieutenant-General Sir James Murray (1904–1907)
 Major-General Sir Charles Hadden (1907–1913)
 Major-General Sir Stanley von Donop (1913–1916)
 Lieutenant-General Sir William Furse (1916–1919)
 Lieutenant-General Sir John Du Cane (1920–1923)
 Lieutenant-General Sir Noel Birch (1923–1927)
 Lieutenant-General Sir Webb Gillman (1927–1931)
 Lieutenant-General Sir Ronald Charles (1931–1934)
 Lieutenant-General Sir Hugh Elles (1934–1938)

1939–1958
The post was abolished by Leslie Hore-Belisha, the Secretary of State for War, as he perceived it to be a block on production, transferring tank development responsibility to the Director General of Munitions Development. It was not re-instated until 1959.

Master-General of the Ordnance 1960 to 2013
 Lieutenant-General Sir John Cowley (1960–1962)
 General Sir Cecil Sugden (1962–1963)
 Lieutenant-General Sir Charles Jones (1963–1966)
 Lieutenant-General Sir Charles Richardson (1966–1971)
 General Sir Noel Thomas (1971–1974)
 General Sir John Gibbon (1974–1977)
 General Sir Hugh Beach (1977–1981)
 General Sir Peter Leng (1981–1983)
 General Sir Richard Vincent (1983–1987)
 General Sir John Stibbon (1987–1991)
 General Sir Jeremy Blacker (1991–1995)
 Lieutenant-General Sir Robert Hayman-Joyce (1995–1998)
 Major General David Jenkins (1998–2000)
 Major General Peter Gilchrist (2000–2004)
 Major General Andrew Figgures (2004–2006)
 Major-General Dick Applegate (June 2006 – November 2006)
 Major General Chris Wilson (2006–2010)
 Major General Bill Moore (2010–2011)Post holders official dual title was: Director Land Capability and Transformation and Master-General of the Ordnance''
 Major General Nick Pope (2011–2013)

References 

Senior appointments of the British Army
War Office